A Gaza Weekend is a British-Palestinian comedy film, directed by Basil Khalil and released in 2022. The film stars Stephen Mangan and Mouna Hawa as Michael and Keren, a British-Israeli couple who are trying to take refuge in the Gaza Strip after the accidental release of a dangerous virus from a scientific research lab in Israel has ironically made Gaza the safest place to be due to Israel's blockade of the region.

Although it centres around a viral pandemic, the film was conceived and in development well before the emergence of the COVID-19 pandemic.

The film premiered on 10 September 2022 at the 2022 Toronto International Film Festival, where it was named the winner of the FIPRESCI Prize.

References

External links

2022 films
2022 comedy films
British comedy films
Palestinian comedy films
2020s British films
Films set in the Gaza Strip